Yesil District, is an administrative subdivision of the city of Astana, Kazakhstan.

References

External links
  

Districts of Astana